is a Prefectural Natural Park in central Hyōgo Prefecture, Japan. Established in 1957, the park spans the municipalities of Katō, Nishiwaki, Sanda, and Sasayama. Designation of the park helps protect the habitat of the Japanese giant salamander (Special Natural Monument), kitsune, and tanuki.

See also
 National Parks of Japan

References

Parks and gardens in Hyōgo Prefecture
Protected areas established in 1957
1957 establishments in Japan